Jalna dry port is a proposed dry port (inland port) in Maharashtra, India, near Aurangabad, Maharashtra. It will be developed by Jawaharlal Nehru Port Trust (JNPT).
This dry port will occupy 180 hectares of land.

To be built by the Jawaharlal Nehru Port Trust(JNPT), the dry port near Jalna is expected to operate as one of the largest major container ports of India with an upcoming container handling capacity of almost 10 million Twenty-foot Equivalent Unit (TEU). As announced earlier, JNPT envisaged the need to establish extended logistic facilities in the hinterland to facilitate the overall operations at the port.future.
Geographically strategic locations of Jalna and Aurangabad for Jalna dry port along with Delhi–Mumbai Industrial Corridor Project and Mumbai–Nagpur Expressway Samrudhhi Mahamarg would make these cities “growth engines” of Maharashtra in the future.

References

Dry ports
Ports and harbours of Maharashtra
Jalna district
Proposed infrastructure in Maharashtra
Transport in Jalna